"Thank You" is a song written by Sandra Nordström, Mathias Venge and Peter Wennerberg, and performed by Amy Diamond at Melodifestivalen 2008. The song participated in the first semifinal in Gothenburg on 9 February 2008 and headed directly to the finals, held inside the Stockholm Globe Arena on 15 March that year. Once there, the song ended up 8th.

The single peaked at number eight on the Swedish singles chart.

On 20 April 2008, the song was tested for Svensktoppen, which however failed.

Charts

Weekly charts

Year-end charts

References

2008 songs
2008 singles
Amy Deasismont songs
English-language Swedish songs
Melodifestivalen songs of 2008